Poul Knudsen may refer to:

 Poul Knudsen (writer) (1889–1974), Danish writer
 Poul Knudsen (boxer) (born 1951), Danish Olympic boxer